Ernst Albrecht (July 28, 1914 – December 1, 1991) was a German politician of the Christian Democratic Union (CDU) and former member of the German Bundestag.

Life 
From 1949 to 1954 Albrecht, who had joined the CDU in 1946, was a member of the Altona District Assembly. From 1953 to 1 November 1956 and from 1957 to 1961 he was a member of the Hamburg City Council. He was a member of the German Bundestag from 11 May 1956, when he succeeded Karlfranz Schmidt-Wittmack until the end of the second legislative period.

Literature

References

1914 births
1991 deaths
Members of the Bundestag for Hamburg
Members of the Bundestag 1953–1957
Members of the Bundestag for the Christian Democratic Union of Germany
Members of the Hamburg Parliament